The First cabinet of Steingrímur Hermannsson in Iceland was formed 26 May 1983.

Cabinets

Inaugural cabinet: 26 May 1983 – 16 October 1985

First reshuffle: 16 October 1985 – 24 January 1986
Albert Sigurður Guðmundsson replaced Sverrir Hermannsson as Minister of Industry. Matthías Bjarnason replaced Matthías Árni Mathiesen as Minister of Commerce. Ragnhildur Helgadóttir replaced Matthías Bjarnason as Minister of Health and Social Security. Sverrir Hermannsson replaced Ragnhildur Helgadóttir as Minister of Education, Science and Culture. Þorsteinn Pálsson replaced Albert Sigurður Guðmundsson as Minister of Finance and Matthías Árni Mathiesen as Minister of Statistics Iceland.

Second reshuffle: 24 January 1986 – 24 March 1987
Matthías Árni Mathiesen replaced Geir Hallgrímsson as Minister for Foreign Affairs.

Third reshuffle: 24 March 1987 – 8 July 1987
Þorsteinn Pálsson replaced Albert Sigurður Guðmundsson as Minister of Industry.

See also
Government of Iceland
Cabinet of Iceland

References

Steingrimur Hermannsson, First cabinet of
Steingrimur Hermannsson, First cabinet of
Steingrimur Hermannsson, First cabinet of
Cabinets established in 1983
Cabinets disestablished in 1987
Independence Party (Iceland)
Progressive Party (Iceland)